Gleeson may refer to:

 Gleeson, Arizona, an American ghost town
 Gleeson College, Adelaide, Australia, a Catholic secondary school
 Gleeson (surname), people with the surname
 Gleeson Hedge, a character in mythology novels by Rick Riordan

See also
 Gleeson gunfight (1917), one of the last gunfights of the American Old West
 Gleason (disambiguation)